Sir Francis Pakenham  (29 February 1832 – 26 January 1905) was a British diplomat who was envoy to Chile, Argentina and Sweden.

Career
The Honourable Francis John Pakenham was the seventh son of Thomas Pakenham, 2nd Earl of Longford. He was educated privately and at Christ Church, Oxford. He joined the Diplomatic Service in 1852 and served at Buenos Aires, Rio de Janeiro, Stockholm, Brussels, Washington, D.C. and Copenhagen before being appointed Minister Resident at Santiago, Chile, 1878–1885, Envoy Extraordinary and Minister Plenipotentiary to Argentina and non-resident minister to Paraguay 1885–1896, and Minister to Sweden and Norway 1896–1902. During this last posting he was knighted KCMG in the New Year Honours of 1898.

References

Sources

PAKENHAM, Hon. Sir Francis John , Who Was Who, A & C Black, 1920–2008; online edn, Oxford University Press, Dec 2012
Obituary – Sir Francis Pakenham,The Times, London, 28 January 1905, page 9

1832 births
1905 deaths
Francis John
Alumni of Christ Church, Oxford
Ambassadors of the United Kingdom to Chile
Ambassadors of the United Kingdom to Argentina
Ambassadors of the United Kingdom to Paraguay
Ambassadors of the United Kingdom to Sweden
Knights Commander of the Order of St Michael and St George